The Øvre Stabu spearhead is an iron spearhead which bears an Elder Futhark inscription dated to the second half of the 2nd century, making it one of the oldest runic inscriptions preserved.
It was discovered on the Øvre Stabu farm at Eastern Toten, Oppland, Norway, in one of two graves, alongside other grave goods. The spearhead is of the Vennolum type (a term for a type of lancehead typical of the period, of which about 300 specimens are known) and has a length of 28 cm. The runes are incised using a 'zig-zag' technique, and are partly lost due to corrosion.

The inscription reads  (raunijaz), presumably recording the name of the spear. The name is interpreted as the Common Germanic  (Proto-Norse) form of Old Norse reynir, meaning "tester". Compare the Gothic inscriptions on the spearhead of Kovel  (tilarids, "thither-rider") and the spearhead of Dahmsdorf-Müncheberg  (ranja, "router").

See also
Migration Period spear

References
Tineke Looijenga, Texts & contexts of the oldest Runic inscriptions, BRILL, 2003, pp. 78, 93, 101, 126, 128, 136, 149, 151, 336, 338, 357.

External links
image

Elder Futhark inscriptions
Archaeology of Norway
2nd-century inscriptions